La amante estelar is a 1968 37-minute Spanish film directed by Antonio de Lara, based on a novel by William S. Stewart. It stars
Elena Arnao, Claudia Cardinale, and Pedro Costa. The film was produced by Escuela Oficial de Cinematografía.

References

External links

1968 films
1968 short films
Spanish short films
Films based on novels
Films directed by Antonio de Lara
1960s Spanish films